() (lit. Lieutenant Superior or Superior Lieutenant) is a senior field officer rank in several German-speaking and Scandinavian countries, equivalent to lieutenant colonel. It is currently used by both the ground and air forces of Austria, Germany, Switzerland, Denmark, and Norway. The Swedish rank  is a direct translation, as is the Finnish rank .

Austria 

Austria's armed forces, the Bundesheer, uses the rank Oberstleutnant as its sixth-highest officer rank. Like in Germany and Switzerland, Oberstleutnants are above Majors and below Obersts. The term also finds usage with the Austrian Bundespolizei (federal police force) and Justizwache (prison guards corps). These two organizations are civilian in nature, but their ranks are nonetheless structured in a military fashion.

Belgium

Denmark

Ranked OF-4 within NATO and having the paygrade of M401, it is used in the Royal Danish Army and the Royal Danish Air Force.

Germany

Typically, suffixes can be applied to the word Oberstleutnant to specify the individual type of officer. Retired officers that are not incapacitated (i.e. theoretically available for reactivation) from service continue to use their title with the suffix a.D. (Germany) or aD (Switzerland), an abbreviation of außer Dienst, 'out of service'. Suffixes that specify military specialization in active service include Oberstleutnant i.G. ('im Generalstabsdienst') for general staff officers or Oberstleutnant d.R. ('der Reserve') for reservists. The suffix i.R. ('im Ruhestand'), implying retirement without the legal specification of a.D., is unofficial.

Bundeswehr 
The armed forces of West Germany and unified Germany since 1955, the Bundeswehr uses the Oberstleutnant rank in the German Army and German Air Force. Equivalents in the other branches are Fregattenkapitän for the German Navy, Oberfeldarzt for medical staff, Flottillenarzt for naval medical staff, Oberfeldapotheker for apothecary staff, Flottillenapotheker for naval apothecary staff, and Oberfeldveterinär for veterinary medical staff.

Within the German state employee paygrade system, the Oberstleutnant is placed within Besoldungsgruppe A and receives either the A14 or A15 paygrades, depending on individual seniority. Thus, the Oberstleutnant is paid an equivalent wage to that of first-class consuls and legates in the foreign service (A14) or state-employed school directors, ambassadors and general consuls (A15).

The age limit for Oberstleutnant-rank officers is 61.

The Oberstleutnant's shoulder straps in Army and Air Force are marked by two vertically aligned stars above oak leaves.

Bundesgrenzschutz 
The Bundesgrenzschutz police force used the rank Oberstleutnant until 1976, and was subsequently replaced by the terms Polizeioberrat and Polizeidirektor during the government's effort to differentiate between West Germany's police and armed forces.

Wehrmacht and Waffen-SS 
The Wehrmacht (1935-1945) of Nazi Germany used the rank of Oberstleutnant for Army and Air Force, much in the same style the Bundeswehr does. The Waffen-SS (1933-1945) used the rank Obersturmbannführer as an equivalent.

Nationale Volksarmee (NVA) 
The National People's Army (1956-1990) of East Germany used the rank Oberstleutnant (abbr. OSL) for its army and air force, whereas the Volksmarine used the term Fregattenkapitän.

Norway

Sweden

The Swedish variant , is a senior field grade military officer rank in the Swedish Army and the Swedish Air Force, immediately below the rank of colonel and just above the rank of major. It is equivalent to the naval rank of Commodore captain in the Swedish Navy.

Switzerland

Swiss Guard

See also
 Ranks of the German Bundeswehr
 Rank insignia of the German Bundeswehr
 Comparative military ranks of World War I
 Comparative military ranks of World War II

References
Citations

Bibliography
 
 
 
 

Military ranks of Germany

de:Oberstleutnant